London Kills Me is a 1991 film written and directed by Hanif Kureshi and starred Justin Chadwick and Steven Mackintosh.

Cast and roles
 Justin Chadwick as Clint Eastwood
 Steven Mackintosh as Muffdiver
  as Sylvie
 Roshan Seth as Dr. Bubba
 Fiona Shaw as Headley
 Brad Dourif as Hemingway
 Tony Haygarth as Burns
 Eleanor David as Lily
 Alun Armstrong as John Stone
 Nick Dunning as Faulkner
 Naveen Andrews as Bike
 Rowena King as Melanie
 Stevan Rimkus as Tom Tom
 Ben Peel as DJ at Party
 Danny John-Jules as Black Man at Party
 Paudge Behan as White Thug at Party
 Yemi Goodman Ajibade as Tramp
 Sandy McDade as Woman Diner
 Tracey MacLeod as TV Interviewer
 George Miller as Mr. Runcipher
 Philip Glenister as Suited Man
 Charlie Creed-Miles as Kid in Lift
 Karl Collins as Barman
 Sean Pertwee as German Tourist
 Pippa Hinchley as German Tourist
 Marianne Jean-Baptiste as Nanny
 Garry Cooper as Mr. G
 Gordon Warnecke as Mr. G's Assistant
 Dave Atkins as Heavy

References

External links
 
 
 

Films set in London
1991 films
Films with screenplays by Hanif Kureishi
1991 comedy films
British comedy films
1990s English-language films
1990s British films